Echinicola pacifica  is a heterotrophic and motile bacterium from the genus of Echinicola which has been isolated from the sea urchin Strongylocentrotus intermedius from the Troitsa Bay in the Sea of Japan.

References

External links
Type strain of Echinicola pacifica at BacDive -  the Bacterial Diversity Metadatabase

Cytophagia
Bacteria described in 2006